Zargari may refer to

Zargari, Afghanistan, a village in Ghazni Province, Afghanistan
Zargari, Khyber Pakhtunkhwa, a village in Hangu District, Pakistan
Zargari people, a Balkan Romani ethnic group in Iran 
Zargari Romani, the Indo-Aryan language of the Zargari people
Zargari (game), a language game based on Persian